Nan Madol is an archaeological site adjacent to the eastern shore of the island of Pohnpei, now part of the Madolenihmw district of Pohnpei state in the Federated States of Micronesia in the western Pacific Ocean. Nan Madol was the capital of the Saudeleur dynasty until about 1628. The city, constructed in a lagoon, consists of a series of small artificial islands linked by a network of canals. The site core with its stone walls encloses an area approximately 1.5 km long by 0.5 km wide and it contains 92 artificial islets—stone and coral fill platforms—bordered by tidal canals.

The name Nan Madol means "within the intervals" and is a reference to the canals that crisscross the ruins. The original name was Soun Nan-leng (Reef of Heaven), according to Gene Ashby in his book Pohnpei, An Island Argosy. It is often called the "eighth wonder of the world," or the "Venice of the Pacific".

History
Nan Madol was the ceremonial and political seat of the Saudeleur Dynasty, which united Pohnpei's estimated population of 25,000 people until about 1628. Set apart between the main island of Pohnpei and Temwen Island, it was a scene of human activity as early as the first or second century AD. By the 8th or 9th century, islet construction had started, with construction of the distinctive megalithic architecture beginning 1180–1200 AD.

Little can be verified about the megalithic construction. Pohnpeian tradition claims that the builders of the Leluh archaeological site on Kosrae (likewise composed of huge stone buildings) migrated to Pohnpei, where they used their skills and experience to build the even more impressive Nan Madol complex. Radiocarbon dating indicates that Nan Madol predates Leluh; thus, it is more likely that Nan Madol influenced Leluh.

According to Pohnpeian legend, Nan Madol was constructed by twin sorcerers Olisihpa and Olosohpa from the mythical Western Katau, or Kanamwayso. The brothers arrived in a large canoe seeking a place to build an altar so that they could worship Nahnisohn Sahpw, the god of agriculture. After several false starts, the two brothers successfully built an altar off Temwen Island, where they performed their rituals. In legend, these brothers levitated the huge stones with the aid of a flying dragon. When Olisihpa died of old age, Olosohpa became the first Saudeleur. Olosohpa married a local woman and sired twelve generations, producing sixteen other Saudeleur rulers of the Dipwilap ("Great") clan.

The founders of the dynasty ruled kindly, though their successors placed ever increasing demands on their subjects. Their reign ended with the invasion by Isokelekel, who also resided at Nan Madol, though his successors abandoned the site. Polish ethnographer and oceanographer John Stanislaw Kubary made the first detailed description of Nan Madol in 1874.

Purpose and features

The elite centre was a special place of residence for the nobility and of mortuary activities presided over by priests. Its population almost certainly did not exceed 1,000, and may have been less than half that. Although many of the residents were chiefs, the majority were commoners. Nan Madol served, in part, as a way for the ruling Saudeleur chiefs to organize and control potential rivals by requiring them to live in the city rather than in their home districts, where their activities were difficult to monitor.

Madol Powe, the mortuary sector, contains 58 islets in the northeastern area of Nan Madol. Most islets were once occupied by the dwellings of priests. Some islets served a special purpose: food preparation, canoe construction on Dapahu, and coconut oil preparation on Peinering. This was built for the first Saudeleur.

On Nan Madol, there is no fresh water or food; water must be collected and food grown inland. During Saudeleur rule, Pohnpeians brought essential food and water by boat. The Saudeleur received food at a particular islet — first Peiniot, and later the closer Usennamw.

Around 1628, when Isokelekel overthrew the Saudeleurs and began the Nahnmwarki Era, the Nahnmwarkis lived at Nan Madol, but had to gather their own water and grow their own food. This is thought to have caused them eventually to abandon Nan Madol and move back to their own districts, although there are other explanations for the desertion of the complex, such as a sharp population decline.

Archaeology

The site core with its stone walls encloses an area approximately  containing 92 artificial islets—stone and coral fill platforms—bordered by tidal canals.

Carbon dating indicates that megalithic construction at Nan Madol began around AD 1180 when large basalt stones were taken from a volcanic plug on the opposite side of Pohnpei.  The earliest settlement on Pohnpei was probably around AD 1 although radiocarbon dating shows human activity starting around AD 80–200.

In 1985, the ruins of Nan Madol were declared a National Historical Landmark.

Until its closure in 2012, objects from the site were displayed at Lidorkini Museum.

Lost continent theories

Nan Madol has been interpreted by some as the remains of one of the "lost continents" of Lemuria or Mu. Nan Madol was one of the sites James Churchward identified as being part of the lost continent of Mu, starting in his 1926 book The Lost Continent of Mu Motherland of Man.

In popular culture

Television 
 Featured on the TV series Destination Truth where these ruins are said to be haunted.
 Featured on the TV series Ancient Aliens season 6 episode 9 which focuses on supposed extraterrestrial origins.
 Featured as the main premise on episode 2 of the National Geographic TV series Lost Cities With Albert Lin.

Games 

 The DLC map "Zetsubo No Shima" for the video game Call of Duty: Black Ops III is based on this location.

 Nan Madol is featured as a city state in Civilization 6

Literature 
 The ruins of Nan Madol were used as the setting for a lost race story by A. Merritt, The Moon Pool (1918), in which the islands are called Nan-Tauach and the ruins are called the Nan-Matal.
 Nan Madol and its history have been used as the basis of the novel Deep Fathom (2001) written by James Rollins.
 In the comic Nameless by Grant Morrison and Chris Burnham, the city of Nan Madol is the location of the mythical Dream Key of Nan Samwohl.

Music 
Nan Madol (1974) is an album recorded by Edward Vesala.
Nan Ma Dol is a song recorded by the band Endura and released on their Liber Leviathan album (1996).
Ruins of Nan Madol (2014) is a song recorded by Audiomachine.

See also
 Gunung Padang - man-made megalithic site built using columnar jointed volcanics
 List of places with columnar jointed volcanics
 Nation - a novel that spotlights a lost Pacific advanced civilization

References

Notes

Footnotes

Bibliography 

 Ayres, William S. Nan Madol, Pohnpei. SAA Bulletin. Vol. 10, Nov. 1992. Society for American Archaeology.
 Ayres, William S. Pohnpei's Position in Eastern Micronesian Prehistory, Micronesica, Supplement 2: Proceedings, Indo Pacific Prehistory Association, Guam, 1990, pp. 187–212.
 Ayres, William S. Mystery Islets of Micronesia. Archaeology Jan-Feb 1990, pp. 58–63.
 Ratzel, Prof. Friedrich The History of Mankind Book II, London 1896. Races of the Pacific and their migrations pp.  159-60. Includes a drawing entitled `Sepulchral monument in Ponapé, Caroline Islands. (From a photograph in the Godeffroy Album.)'

External links 

 

1874 archaeological discoveries
Archaeological sites in the Federated States of Micronesia
Artificial islands
Buildings and structures on the National Register of Historic Places in the Federated States of Micronesia
Former populated places in Oceania
Historic districts on the National Register of Historic Places in the Federated States of Micronesia
Lost ancient cities and towns
National Historic Landmarks in the Federated States of Micronesia
National Register of Historic Places in the Federated States of Micronesia
Pohnpei
Populated places disestablished in 1628
Populated places established in the 1st century
Populated places established in the 2nd century
Ruins in the Federated States of Micronesia
World Heritage Sites in the Federated States of Micronesia
Megalithic monuments